Umineko When They Cry is an anime television series, based on the sound novel series of the same name by the Japanese dōjin soft maker 07th Expansion. Produced by Studio Deen, it is directed by Chiaki Kon, written by Toshifumi Kawase, and features character design by Yoko Kikuchi, who based the designs on original creator Ryukishi07's original concept.

The story focuses on a group of eighteen people on a secluded island for a period of two days, and the mysterious murders that befall most of the people. The 26 episodes in the series aired in Japan between July 2 and December 24, 2009 on the Chiba TV broadcasting network and aired on additional stations at later times. Six BD and DVD compilation volumes were released in Japan by Geneon Universal Entertainment between October 23, 2009 and March 25, 2010.

Episode list

Home media

DVD and Blu-ray

References

External links
Anime official website 

Lists of anime episodes